The 2002 Arizona Wildcats football team represented the University of Arizona during the 2002 NCAA Division I-A football season. They were coached by John Mackovic in his second season with the Wildcats. Arizona ended the season with a record of 4–8 (1–7 against Pac-10 opponents) and finished tied for last place in the Pac-10 standings.

After starting the season 3–1, the Wildcats would continue to struggle in conference play, winning only a single game at California. Late in the season, Mackovic would become embroiled in controversy as a result of mistreatment of players. The team would not recover and ended the year with another losing record.

Before the season
Arizona completed the 2001 season in Mackovic’s first year with the program with a 5–6 record and a victory over rival Arizona State. The team would rebuild during the offseason and hoped to improve on their record for 2002. With receiver Bobby Wade and linebacker Lance Briggs returning for their final season for one last crack at a bowl game appearance, the Wildcats looked to contend for a winning season and fulfill Mackovic’s promise of reaching the Rose Bowl.

Schedule

Roster

Game summaries

Northern Arizona
The Wildcats began the season by hosting in-state foe Northern Arizona from Flagstaff. It was the first meeting between the two since 1945. The Wildcats would dominate the Lumberjacks from the start for an easy win.

Utah
In their next game against Utah, Arizona started off hot with a Wade touchdown catch. The Wildcats would add to their lead with a pair of field goals before halftime. In the second half, Arizona increased their lead after a Briggs forced fumble which turned into another field goal.

By the fourth quarter, the Utes would rally to cut the Arizona lead to a single score. In the final minute, they threatened to possibly win it by entering Wildcat territory. They would be denied a touchdown when a Utah receiver stepped out of bounds after a catch, though replays showed that he may have had a foot in bounds, which became controversial among Utah fans. A few plays later, the Wildcats would stop the Utes short of the goal line on fourth down, and Arizona survived move to 2–0 for the second consecutive season under Mackovic. Arizona’s defense shut down Utah’s rushing offense (which was ranked second at the time), limiting them to only 36 yards.

Wisconsin
Arizona traveled to Wisconsin to play the #22 Badgers in the first ever meeting between the two teams. After a scoreless first quarter, Wisconsin broke it open with 24 points, drawing comparisons to Arizona’s embarrassing loss to Penn State in 1999. The Wildcats would play better in the second half, but the big halftime deficit would be too much for them to overcome and lost for the first time in the season. Arizona’s dominant offense fell silent against the Badgers and Mackovic lost his first non-conference game as Wildcat coach.

Oregon
After a close win over North Texas (which featured Arizona’s blocked field goal return for a touchdown before halftime), the Wildcats hosted Oregon yet again. Arizona looked great early, leading 14-7 after the opening quarter. However, the eighth-ranked Ducks would take control of the game and shut out the Wildcats the rest of the way. Despite the loss, Wade had a career-high 12 receptions, including a touchdown.

Washington
The Wildcats visited Washington for the third straight season. Arizona would lead in the fourth quarter, only to see the #22 Huskies come back with a long touchdown catch and run past their secondary and gave the Wildcats another stunning loss for the third year in a row.

Washington State
Arizona returned home and played against ninth-ranked Washington State, who ironically, was the team that the Wildcats beat for their last Pac-10 home win in 2000 (when they still had Dick Tomey as coach before hiring Mackovic). The defense, led by Briggs, would keep the Wildcats in it, but the offense sputtered, mostly due to being blitzed by the Cougars. Arizona would make crucial mistakes in the final quarter after having chances to come back, and would lead to another loss.

UCLA
On homecoming day, the Wildcats hosted UCLA. Arizona’s offense continued to struggle, and only scored on a long catch and run for a touchdown that would prevent a shutout. The defense was hurt by penalties and poor tackling, leading to the Bruins scoring over 30 points. The Wildcats would go on to drop their sixth consecutive loss of the year.

Mackovic controversy
Controversy erupted days after the loss, when Mackovic told one of his players that his poor blocking during the game made him a “disgrace to his family”, which hurt his feelings, as well as his teammates. Led by Briggs, the players reported the incident to both the Arizona president and athletic director, and discussed about a series of abuses by Mackovic, including one where Mackovic made a meltdown to the team after the loss to Wisconsin earlier in the season. The news made headlines around the Arizona campus as well as Tucson. In a press conference, Mackovic issued an apology to the program and the community and promised to treat respect to the team. Despite fans calling for his firing for both his behavior and the team’s losses, Mackovic would remain the coach through the end of the season.

California
After moving on from the Mackovic fiasco, Arizona visited California, looking to break their losing streak. The Wildcats would dominate on offense, throwing for nearly 500 yards. Wade had over 200 yards receiving and tight end Justin Levasseur, who was the player that Mackovic mistreated which started the controversy, caught a touchdown pass to give Arizona the lead for good. The Wildcats’ defense would play poor, but their offensive performance was just enough for them to get past the Golden Bears to end their slump for their first Pac-10 win in a high-scoring match. It was the second consecutive year that Mackovic won his first conference game at California.

Arizona State

Mackovic looked to earn his second straight “Duel in the Desert” win as the Wildcats went back to Tucson to face Arizona State in the rivalry game. Arizona donned blue pants for the game, which was the first time that they wore them at home in their history (they had worn white pants for all home games before then).

In a game that was filled with turnovers and penalties, the Wildcats led 13-10 at the half, but would make the more crucial mistakes that would cost them, as ASU would capitalize in the second half and would outscore Arizona to end the Wildcats’ season with a 4-8 record. Both Wade and Briggs finished their Wildcat careers with a 1–3 record against the Sun Devils and no bowl appearances. Several mistakes thwarted scoring chances for Arizona and near the end of the game, the Wildcats’ student section chanted for Mackovic to be fired and the Wildcats’ futile season was finally over.

Awards and honors
Bobby Wade, WR, First-team All-Pac-10

Lance Briggs, LB, First-team All-Pac-10

Ray Wells, LB, First-team All-Pac-10

Makoa Freitas, OL, Second-team All-Pac-10

Season notes
Arizona played twelve games in a season for the first time since 1999.

Arizona opened the year against Northern Arizona and the two would play often frequently since then (NAU would play ASU a few times). The Wildcats would dominate NAU in most of their future matchups until NAU would finally win in 2021.

The Wildcats would not beat Utah again until 2012, when Utah and Arizona became conference foes.

This was the first and only time that Arizona and North Texas would meet (the Wildcats defeated the Mean Green in a game that featured Arizona scoring on a blocked kick, which remains the most recent time that they would return a blocked field goal for a score).

This was the third consecutive year that Arizona had a near-miss of defeating Washington after the Huskies scoring late to win.

The Wildcats did not score a touchdown in their losses to Stanford and Oregon State (both on the road). The former would be Stanford’s only conference win of the season and the latter being an identical final score from the previous season (38-3).

The game against California (which aired on FSN) was not broadcast live in the Tucson market, supposedly due to the controversy involving Mackovic. Arizona fans would eventually view the game, as FSN aired it on a tape delay later that day as well as the following day.

The win over Cal would be the only good thing for the team following the Mackovic controversy, as Arizona officials believed that the Wildcats would not win a big game as long as Mackovic was coach due to his troubles.

In the loss to Arizona State, fans who were furious over Mackovic and the inability to win big games, chanted “Fire Mackovic” and “We have basketball” as time expired at the end of the game, referring the fact that they were relived that the season was over and wanted the Wildcats to get a new coach to bring honesty, and looked to basketball as that program was continuing to be dominant.

With Arizona continuously losing in Pac-10 play and the fallout of Mackovic late in the season, it broke the promise of him leading the team to the Rose Bowl as coach when he was hired before the 2001 season.

As Wade would graduate after the season, this was officially the last year of Arizona’s “Desert Storm” era (a phrase that referenced the Wildcats’ dominant offense that began in their big 1998 season and was a pun on their dominant “Desert Swarm” defense under Tomey in the early 1990s).

Wade made Arizona history this season, as he caught 93 passes, which broke the Arizona record for most receptions for a receiver in a single season. Wade passed Dennis Northcutt’s record of 88 from 1999 and the 93 receptions in 2002 is still an Arizona record to this day. Also, Wade is second to Northcutt in terms of single-season receiving yards with 1,389 this season (Northcutt had 1,422 in 1999) and holds the record for career receiving yards with 3,351, surpassing Northcutt’s record of 3,252. Wade is behind Northcutt with 23 touchdowns (Northcutt had 24) and held the Arizona record of career receptions with 230 until Mike Thomas broke it in 2008 with 259.

Arizona’s 1–7 conference record would end up being one of the worst records in their history. They would also tie that record in the following year.

After the season
As Arizona finished with yet another losing season, Mackovic was retained for the 2003 season, despite fans calling for him to be fired. However, Mac Duff was fired as defensive coordinator due to the team’s poor defensive performance, which ended his Arizona career for good. The Wildcats struggled on defense in Mac Duff’s second stint with the program, as opposed to his first when they were dominant under him and Tomey.

Many players considered leaving the team or transferring to other schools during the offseason as a result of Mackovic’s behavior. It would affect recruiting and fan interest, leading to a worst 2003 season, where Mackovic would finally be fired as coach.

References

Arizona
Arizona Wildcats football seasons
Arizona Wildcats football